Aral, Azerbaijan may refer to:
Birinci Aral
İkinci Aral